Kevin Tanner (born February 10, 1972) is an American politician in Georgia. He has been a Republican member of Georgia House of Representatives from District 9 from 2013 to 2021.

Career 
Tanner was a chief deputy sheriff and county administrator.

State House tenure
Tanner was sworn into the Georgia House on January 14, 2013.

In 2013, Tanner introduced legislation that would classify the identity of companies that supply execution drugs to Georgia as a "confidential state secret" and thus preclude the information's release to the public. The bill was enacted.

Tanner is strongly anti-abortion, and voted in favor of the "fetal heartbeat bill" in the state House. He voted for the purchase of new electronic voting machines for Georgia, in a measure that passed along a party-line vote, and claimed in 2019 that "the best way to rig or cheat in an election is paper ballots."

In 2015, Tanner was the sponsor of legislation that would restrict police from using "no-knock warrants" at nighttime (between 10 p.m. and 6 a.m.) in most circumstances.

In 2016, Tanner sponsored legislation to regulate the use of unmanned aircraft systems (drones) in Georgia.

In 2016, Tanner was the lead sponsor of legislation to allow businesses to refuse services to same-sex couples.

In the state House, Tanner was chairman of the Transportation Committee, at a time when transportation issues became high-profile in Georgia.

In 2018 and 2019, Tanner proposed a rural transportation bill. The legislation passed the state House overwhelmingly, but died in the state Senate amid opposition from the Georgia Department of Transportation, which objected to the portions of the bill that would have consolidated state transit operations.

In March 2019, Tanner and House members passed a measure to establishing a legislative oversight committee to monitor the operations of Hartsfield–Jackson Atlanta International Airport and Georgia's other commercial airports. The legislation was a milder version of a more controversial state Senate bill, which would have implemented a state takeover of the Hartsfield–Jackson airport. The House legislation, which passed 104–70, also included a jet fuel tax break for airlines and a rural transportation package.

2020 congressional campaign

In 2020, Tanner officially announced his candidacy for the Republican nomination for Congress in Georgia's 9th congressional district, for the seat vacated by Republican U.S. Representative Doug Collins, who is running for U.S. Senate.

The congressional district is a Republican safe seat. Tanner in running against former Representative Paul Broun, State Senator John Wilkinson, and State Representative Matt Gurtler in the Republican primary. Tanner, like the other the candidates for the Republican nomination, ran on a right-wing, pro-Donald Trump message. He vowed to combat what he asserted to be "attempts to overthrow an election through this impeachment nonsense, socialists running for president, a resistance to support President Trump in building the wall, and Nancy Pelosi and the Socialist Squad trying to destroy our values." Tanner's candidacy was backed by influential Georgia Republicans, including former Governor Nathan Deal and allies of Governor Brian Kemp.

Personal life
Tanner's wife is Stacie Tanner. They have four children. Tanner and his family live in Dawsonville, Georgia.

References

External links 
 Kevin Tanner at ballotpedia.org

Living people
Republican Party members of the Georgia House of Representatives
Candidates in the 2020 United States elections
21st-century American politicians
1972 births